Bismar Siregar (15 September 1928 in Sipirok, South Tapanuli, North Sumatra – 19 April 2012 in Jakarta) is a former  Judge Supreme Supreme Court. He became Chief Justice in 1984 and resigned in 2000.

Educations 
 University of Indonesia
 National College of the State Judiciary, Reno, United States in 1973
 America Academy of Judicial Education, Tescaloosa, United States in 1973
 Academy of American and International Law, Dallas, United States in 1980

Career 
Siregar is an alumnus of University of Indonesia and started his career as a prosecutor for The State Attorney Kilkenny in 1957 and continued until 1959 in the State Attorney Makassar / Ambon in 1959 up to 1961's career as a judge began in 1961 in the District Court Pangkalpinang.

Death 
He was bleeding in the head with a sudden loss of consciousness before 16 April 2012 when painting at home. He finally died on Thursday, 19 April 2012 at 12:25 pm in Fatmawati Hospital.

External links 
 Innalillahi, Bismar Siregar dies, www.republika.co.id, accessed on 21 April 2012.
 Harifin: Bismar Siregar figure progressive justices, www.antaranews.com, accessed on 21 April 2012. 
 Bismar Siregar, The Idealists Martial Law That Has Gone, www.detik.com, accessed on 21 April 2012. 
 Bismar Siregar and last painting, www.vivanews.com, accessed on 21 April 2012.

1928 births
2012 deaths
20th-century Indonesian judges
People of Batak descent
People from South Tapanuli Regency
Indonesian Muslims
University of Indonesia alumni
Academic staff of the University of Indonesia